David Schnitter (born March 19, 1948, in Newark, New Jersey) is an American jazz tenor saxophonist.

Schnitter played clarinet as a youth and switched to tenor sax at age 15. After moving to New York City he played with Ted Dunbar and then became a member of Art Blakey's Jazz Messengers from 1974 to 1979. He played with Freddie Hubbard from 1979 to 1981 and also worked with Frank Foster, Charles Earland, and Groove Holmes. He recorded for Muse Records from 1976 to 1981. Schnitter has been currently performing regularly at Smalls Jazz Club and Fat Cat in Manhattan, as well as touring in Europe. He has been on faculty at the New School for Jazz and Contemporary Music since 1994.

Discography 
 Invitation (Muse, 1976)
 Goliath (Muse, 1977)
 Thundering (Muse, 1978)
 Glowing (Muse, 1981)
 Sketch (Omix, 2004)
 The Spirit of Things (CIMP, 2008)
 Nursery Rhymes for the 21st Century (Cimp, 2010)
 Live at Smalls (Smalls Live, 2011)

With Art Blakey
 Backgammon (Roulette, 1976)
 Gypsy Folk Tales (Roulette, 1977)
 In My Prime Vol. 1 (Timeless, 1977)
 In My Prime Vol. 2 (Timeless, 1977)
 In This Korner (Concord Jazz, 1978)
 Reflections in Blue (Timeless, 1978)
 Night in Tunisia: Digital Recording (Philips, 1979)
 One by One (Palcoscenico, 1979 [1981])
With Richard "Groove" Holmes
Shippin' Out (Muse, 1978)
With Johnny Lytle
 Everything Must Change (Muse, 1977)
With Red Rodney
Home Free (Muse, 1977 [1979])

References 

1948 births
Living people
American jazz saxophonists
American male saxophonists
The Jazz Messengers members
Musicians from Newark, New Jersey
Muse Records artists
21st-century saxophonists
American male jazz musicians